Karen Irene Tse (born October 20, 1964) is an American human rights defender and social entrepreneur. She is an American of Chinese descent living in Geneva, running a global non-profit organization that fosters legal rights in developing countries.

An international human rights attorney and ordained Unitarian Universalist minister,  Reverend Karen I. Tse works with Rule of Law initiatives across the globe. Tse received her master's degree from Harvard University School of Divinity, and received her J.D. degree from the University of California at Los Angeles (UCLA) School of Law. She obtained her bachelor's degree from Scripps College.

From 1991 to 1994 she was a legal aid lawyer with the San Francisco Public Defender's Office in California. From 1994 to 1996 she was the Deputy Director and Supervising Attorney for the Cambodian Defenders Project in Phnom Penh, Cambodia and from 1996 to 1997 she was a Judicial Mentor for the United Nations Center for Human Rights in Cambodia.

In 2000, Tse founded International Bridges to Justice (IBJ), a non-profit organization which aims to eradicate torture in the 21st century and protect due process rights for accused people throughout the world. IBJ is dedicated to protecting the legal rights of everyday citizens in developing countries, and has a special focus on the indigent accused. The organization focuses on institutionalizing defender practices by training public defenders, or legal aid lawyers, in countries where their help is needed. IBJ has expanded to countries throughout Africa and Asia, including Rwanda, Burundi, China, Cambodia, India, and Zimbabwe.

As a social entrepreneur, Tse is supported by the Skoll,  Echoing Green and Ashoka foundations.

Tse's method is unique, being both bottom-up and top-down, inspired by her twin roles of minister and lawyer. The group supports on-the-ground defense lawyers, but also interacts with police, prosecutors and judges rather than treat them as "the enemy" since they are the entities committing or condoning the abuses. At the same time, IBJ focuses on individual cases but also seeks to reform the overall public justice systems where it operates. This idea of "embracing the other side," as well as working at the individual and system-wide level, makes Tse's and IBJ's work distinctive.

Tse was speaking at conferences, amongst others at the WINConference in 2002, 2011, 2014 and 2015, to find supporters and engagement for International Bridges of Justice. At the WINconference in 2014, she received the WIN Inspiring Women Worldwide Award, an award that recognizes women who model values of global leadership, authentic contribution and integration of noble values, for her contributions to humanity.

References

External links
International Bridges to Justice
Profile at Ashoka.org
Profile at EchoingGreen.org
Karen Tse Receives 2008 ABA International Human Rights Award
Karen Tse Profiled in Forbes: "The Dreamer"
CNN Video: Philanthropy and the Economy
TED Talks: Karen Tse: How to stop torture

1964 births
People from Cleveland
American people of Chinese descent
Harvard Divinity School alumni
Living people
Scripps College alumni
Swiss activists
Swiss humanitarians
Swiss people of American descent
Swiss people of Chinese descent
Swiss Universalists
Swiss women activists
Unitarian Universalists
UCLA School of Law alumni